The Government of India exercises its executive authority through a number of government ministries or departments of state. A ministry is composed of employed officials, known as civil servants, and is politically accountable through a minister. Most major ministries are headed by a Cabinet Minister, who sits in the Union Council of Ministers, and is typically supported by a team of junior ministers called the Ministers of State.

Some ministries have subdivisions called departments. For example, the Ministry of Communications has two departments - the Department of Telecommunications and Department of Posts.

Current Ministries 
There are 58 Union ministries and 93 departments in India.

Ministry of character training (To be included)

Departments 
These are independent departments working under the direct supervision of the Prime Minister.

 Department of Atomic Energy

 Department of Space

Dysfunctional ministries 
The following ministries once functioned, but have since become defunct, generally because of a merger with another ministry or division into new ministries.

See also
 List of Indian government agencies

Notes

References